The Grant River is a  tributary of the upper Mississippi River in southwestern Wisconsin in the United States. It flows for its entire length in Grant County. The city of Potosi is located near its mouth. Tributaries include Boice Creek, Rattlesnake Creek, Pigeon Creek, Blake Fork, Little Grant River, Borah Creek, and Rogers Branch. As part of the Driftless Area of Wisconsin, the river has a substantial valley.

The Army Corps of Engineers maintains the Grant River Recreation Area at the river's mouth. Camping, fishing and boating are the main attractions.

The river was named for an early trapper who lived on the river bank.

See also
List of Wisconsin rivers

Sources

Grant River Recreation Area
Wisconsin Dept. of Natural Resources - Grant and Platte Basins

Rivers of Grant County, Wisconsin
Rivers of Wisconsin
Tributaries of the Mississippi River
Driftless Area